The Crazy Nastyass Honey Badger is a YouTube viral video and Internet meme that first appeared on the Internet in January 2011. The video features commentary by a narrator identified only as "Randall", dubbed over pre-existing Nat Geo Wild footage of honey badgers. Accompanying the narration is the Prelude from J. S. Bach's Cello Suite No. 6 in D major, BWV 1012. Since its release, the video has gained almost 100 million views.

Background
Randall stated he chose to redub the National Geographic footage because "this animal eats King Cobras, demolishes animals, and this narrator that is so boring, so I said, 'we need to spice this thing up.'" Randall also stated that he would be overjoyed if he had the honor of meeting a real honey badger. "If I met a real one, I would, probably like, let it bite my balls off if it wanted to," states Randall in a 2014 interview with Celebs Daily. Randall has also stated he first gained an interest in animals by way of his father, a cameraman for Mutual of Omaha's Wild Kingdom. While not much information has been officially released about the narrator, the New York Observer has claimed a press release for a potential television show based on the video reveals Randall as "Christopher Gordon." Gordon's Twitter account, however, lists him as Randall's assistant.

Response
The video received much attention in early 2011, garnering over 90 million views since its release. References to the video have appeared in American Pickers, Hot in Cleveland, and Glee, with frozen yogurt chain Red Mango offering a flavor named "Honey Badger". The video has been listed as a favorite by Taylor Swift and Olivia Wilde. In 2012, Randall appeared on an episode of America's Got Talent, where he narrated over footage from the show.

Spin offs

Honey Badger Don't Care
In January 2012, Andrews McMeel Publishing released a book featuring comedic commentaries about the honey badger and ten other animals of the wild kingdom. In addition to the honey badger, the book also includes chapters on the aye-aye, the Tasmanian devil, the emperor tamarin, the pink fairy armadillo, the tarsier, the opossum, the solenodon, the wombat, the American bullfrog, and the sloth. Reception to the book has been mixed to positive, with Audubon Magazine writing that the book was "memorable". Willamette Week called the book "amusing, but much of the humor of the video is lost without Randall's narration".

Mobile app
Collaborating with MEDL Mobile, Randall launched "The Honey Badger Don't Care" app in 2011 with an updated version relaunched in 2013. The app was made available on both the Google Play store as well as the Apple iTunes Store.

Internet Video
In October 2020, The Lincoln Project released an online advertisement 'Covey Spreader' featuring a voiceover by Randall. The ad is a parody of the 'Honey Badger Don't Care' video, spotlighting members of the Trump campaign who have been diagnosed with COVID-19 during the campaign.

Television
Randall has voiced several commercials for products such as pistachios and virtual phone systems. In 2012, Randall stated that he was developing a television show with Six Eleven Media entitled Honey Badger U. The show would be a mixture of live action and animation. However, no further developments ensued.

References

External links
 The Crazy Nastyass Honey Badger (original narration by Randall)
 Twitter page for Randall
 Mobile app on iTunes

2011 books
2011 works
2011 YouTube videos
American comedy
Animals on the Internet
Comedy books
Fictional badgers
Fictional weasels
Internet humor
Internet memes introduced in 2011
Viral videos